The 2000–2001 Úrvalsdeild kvenna was the 43rd season of the Úrvalsdeild kvenna, the top tier women's basketball league in Iceland. The season started on October 14, 2000 and ended on March 31 10, 2001. KR won its twelfth title by defeating Keflavík 3–0 in the Finals.

Competition format
The participating teams first played a conventional round-robin schedule with every team playing each opponent twice "home" and twice "away" for a total of 16 games. The top four teams qualified for the championship playoffs while none were relegated to Division I due to vacant berths.

Regular season

Playoffs

Source: 2001 Úrvalsdeild kvenna playoffs

References

External links
Official Icelandic Basketball Federation website

Icelandic
Lea
Úrvalsdeild kvenna seasons (basketball)